

The Replica Plans SE.5a is a Canadian designed biplane for amateur construction from Replica Plans. Designed as a 7/8 size (87.5%) replica of the first world war Royal Aircraft Factory SE.5. The prototype first flew in 1970 and is built of wood and fabric and can use engines from 65 to 125 hp. Estimated construction time is 2500 hours. Most aircraft are painted to represent SE5 aircraft flown in The Great War.

Specifications

See also

References

 

1970s Canadian sport aircraft
Homebuilt aircraft
Replica aircraft
Biplanes
Single-engined tractor aircraft
Aircraft first flown in 1970